Jeunesse Arena is an indoor multi-purpose arena, located in the region of Barra da Tijuca, in Rio de Janeiro, Brazil. It is named for the American cosmetics company Jeunesse Global through a naming rights deal closed in  2017. Before, the sponsor name was HSBC Arena. The arena was completed in July 2007 and was first known as Arena Olímpica do Rio (Rio Olympic Arena), which it was known as during the 2016 Summer Olympics. From December 2007 to March 2008, it was known as RioArena. The arena has a capacity of 15,430 people for sports and up to 18,768 for concerts.

Sports 
The arena hosted the basketball and gymnastics events at the 2007 Pan American Games. In December 2007, it started being operated by GL events, who also operates the nearby Riocentro Convention Center and the Riocentro Sports Complex, and started hosting many concerts from a variety of artists. It has also hosted the telethon show, Criança Esperança, after 2008, replacing Ginásio Ibirapuera as the host. Starting on 29 March 2008, it was renamed as the HSBC Arena, as part of a naming rights agreement with the bank.

The arena hosted UFC's second event in Brazil, UFC 134: Silva vs. Okami, which took place on August 27, 2011. It was the first event in Brazil in over ten years. Eight other UFC events have since been held in the arena: UFC 142: Aldo vs. Mendes, on January 14, 2012; UFC 153: Silva vs. Bonnar, on October 13, 2012; UFC 163: Aldo vs. Korean Zombie, on August 3, 2013; UFC 190: Rousey vs. Correia, on August 1, 2015; UFC 212: Aldo vs. Holloway, on June 3, 2017; UFC 224: Nunes vs. Pennington, on May 12, 2018; UFC 237: Namajunas vs. Andrade, on May 11, 2019; and UFC 283: Teixeira vs. Hill, on January 21, 2023.

An NBA game between the Chicago Bulls and the Washington Wizards was also held at HSBC Arena in 2013. The arena also hosted the 2014 edition of the FIBA Intercontinental Cup between Flamengo and Maccabi Tel Aviv. The NBA also hosted a preseason game between the Cleveland Cavaliers and the Miami Heat on 11 October 2014, as part of the NBA Global Games.

In 2017, the arena hosted the  2017 League of Legends Mid-Season Invitational.

In November 2018, the arena hosted the Tom Clancy's Rainbow Six Siege Season 8 Pro League finals.

In November 2022, the arena hosted the Champions Stage of the IEM Rio Major 2022, the eighteenth Counter-Strike: Global Offensive (CS:GO) Major Championship. The Major was the first held in Brazil and the first held in South America for CS:GO.

Concerts 
Queen + Paul Rodgers concluded their Rock the Cosmos Tour at the arena on 29 November 2008. Demi Lovato performed at the arena for her South American Tour 2010 on May 27, 2010. Miley Cyrus performed at the arena for her Gypsy Heart Tour on May 13, 2011, and it was Cyrus' first concert in Brazil. On March 27, 2011, Iron Maiden's performance at the arena had to be postponed to the following night after a security barrier collapsed during the opening song. The entire audience was allowed to attend the following night's show, although those who couldn't attend were given a refund.

Gallery

References

External links

 Official Jeunesse Arena website
HSBC Arena website 
Website 
HSBC Arena 360° Virtual Tour
UFC no HSBC Arena 

Indoor arenas in Brazil
HSBC buildings and structures
Sports venues in Rio de Janeiro (city)
Venues of the 2016 Summer Olympics
Olympic gymnastics venues
Sports venues completed in 2007
Basketball venues in Brazil
Volleyball venues in Brazil
Barra Olympic Park
Judo venues